The 2022 Challenger Banque Nationale de Saguenay was a professional tennis tournament played on indoor hard courts. It was the fifteenth edition of the tournament which was part of the 2022 ITF Women's World Tennis Tour. It took place in Saguenay, Quebec, Canada between 17 and 23 October 2022.

Champions

Singles

  Karman Thandi def.  Katherine Sebov, 3–6, 6–4, 6–3

Doubles

  Arianne Hartono /  Olivia Tjandramulia def.  Catherine Harrison /  Yanina Wickmayer, 5–7, 7–6(7–3), [10–8]

Singles main draw entrants

Seeds

 1 Rankings are as of 10 October 2022.

Other entrants
The following players received wildcards into the singles main draw:
  Cadence Brace
  Jada Bui
  Ana Grubor
  Marina Stakusic

The following player received entry as a special exempt:
  Stacey Fung

The following players received entry from the qualifying draw:
  Weronika Baszak
  Kayla Cross
  Raveena Kingsley
  María Fernanda Navarro
  Taylor Ng
  Ena Shibahara
  Johanne Svendsen
  Amy Zhu

References

External links
 2022 Challenger Banque Nationale de Saguenay at ITFtennis.com
 Official website

2022 ITF Women's World Tennis Tour
2022 in Canadian tennis
October 2022 sports events in Canada